Royds is a surname, and may refer to:

Charles Royds (1876–1931), Royal Navy officer and Assistant Commissioner "A" of the London Metropolitan Police
Charles Royds (politician) (1827–1898), pastoralist and politician in Queensland
Edmund Royds (1860–1946), English solicitor and Conservative Party politician
Edmund Royds (Queensland politician) (1830–1918), politician in Queensland, Australia
Mabel Allington Royds (1874–1941), English artist known for woodcuts
Pam Royds (1924–2016), British publisher and children's book editor
Percy Royds (1874–1955), British admiral and politician
Thomas Royds (1884–1955), solar physicist